Skigarden Ridge is a ridge with several conspicuous peaks, about 2 nautical miles (3.7 km) northeast of Mount Grytoyr in the Muhlig-Hofmann Mountains of Queen Maud Land. Mapped from surveys and air photos by the Norwegian Antarctic Expedition (1956–60) and named Skigarden (the rail fence).

The Bjørn Spur extends northeastward from Skigarden Ridge.

References

Ridges of Queen Maud Land
Princess Martha Coast